Saha/Shaha  is a Bengali Hindu surname mostly residing in the Indian states of West Bengal, Assam, and Tripura, as well as in Bangladesh.

In the Pala domain a number of inscriptions from the Pala period mentioning communities of merchants have been found, some of which use the title Sadhu for a merchant family.

Notable people
 Anamika Saha, Indian actress
 Arati Saha, First Asian woman to swim across the English channel & first Indian woman sportsperson to receive the padma shri award
Ashim Saha, Bangladeshi poet & recipient of country's second highest civilian award Ekushey padak
Barna Saha, Indian-American computer scientist
Bhaskar Saha, Indian biologist & recipient of country's highest science award shanti swarup bhatnagar prize
Bidya Sinha Saha Mim, Bangladeshi actress
Bhanu Lal Saha, Former finance minister of Tripura 
Chandrima Shaha, Indian biologist & recipient of country's highest science award shanti swarup bhatnagar prize
Chittaranjan Saha, Bangladeshi educationist, publisher and social worker & recipient of country's second highest civilian award Ekushey padak
Debattama Saha, Indian actress
Debojit Saha, Indian singer 
Emon Saha, Bangladeshi composer
 Ena Saha, Indian actress & producer
Ishaa Saha, Indian actress
Kanak Saha, Indian Astrophysicist & recipient of country's highest science award shanti swarup bhatnagar prize
Mahadev Saha, Bangladeshi poet & recipient of country's highest civilian award Independence day award 
Manik Chandra Saha, Bangladeshi journalist & recipient of country's second highest civilian award Ekushey padak (posthumous)
 Meghnad Saha, Indian Astrophysicist & developer of the famous saha ionization equation
Nityanand Saha, Indian revolutionist
Pijush Saha, Indian film director
Ranada Prasad Saha, Bangladeshi businessman and philanthropist & recipient of country's highest civilian award Independence day award (posthumous)
Samir Kumar Saha, Bangladeshi scientist & recipient of country's second highest civilian award Ekushey padak
Sanat Kumar Saha, Bangladeshi economist & recipient of country's second highest civilian award Ekushey padak
Satya Saha, Bangladeshi music director & recipient of country's highest civilian award Independence day award (posthumous)
Senjuti Saha, Bangladeshi scientist 
Shithi Saha, Bangladeshi singer & recipient of Bangladesh national awards - best Tagore singer (4 times)
Subhajit Saha, Indian table tennis player & recipient of gold medal at the 19th commonwealth games  
Subrata Saha, Indian politician 
Swapan Saha, Indian film director
Trina Saha, Indian actress
Wriddhiman Saha, Indian Cricketer

See also
Baishya Saha
Shunri
Shah (surname) in Western India
Saha ionization equation - relating the densities of atoms, ions, and electrons in a plasma.
Saha Airlines - an Iranian airline based in Tehran that operates scheduled domestic flights.
Saha, Ambala - town and tehsil in Ambala district of Haryana state of India.

References

Bengali Hindu surnames